
Gmina Połczyn-Zdrój is an urban-rural gmina (administrative district) in Świdwin County, West Pomeranian Voivodeship, in north-western Poland.

The gmina contains part of the protected area called Drawsko Landscape Park.

Villages
Apart from the town of Połczyn-Zdrój, Gmina Połczyn-Zdrój contains the villages and settlements of Bolkowo, Borkowo, Borucino, Bronówko, Bronowo, Brusno, Brzękowice, Brzozowica, Buślarki, Buślary, Czarnkowie, Dobino, Dziwogóra, Gaworkowo, Gawroniec, Głażówka, Grabno, Gromnik, Grzybnica, Imienko, Jaźwiny, Jelonki, Kapice, Karsin, Karwie, Kłokówko, Kłokowo, Kocury, Kołacz, Kołaczek, Łąkówko, Łęgi, Łężek, Lipno, Łośnica, Międzyborze, Milice, Niemierzyno, Nowe Borne, Nowe Ludzicko, Nowe Resko, Nowy Toporzyk, Ogartówko, Ogartowo, Ogrodno, Ostre Bardo, Ostrowąs, Pasieka, Plebanówka, Połczyńska, Popielawy, Popielewice, Popielewko, Popielewo, Porąbka, Prosno, Przyrówko, Przyrowo, Redło, Rzęsna, Sękorady, Skarbimierz, Słowianki, Smogorze, Stare Resko, Strosławiec, Sucha, Szeligowo, Toporzyk, Tychówko, Wardyń Dolny, Wardyń Górny, Widów, Zaborze, Zajączkówko, Zajączkowo, Zdroiska, Zdroje and Żołędno.

Neighbouring gminas
Gmina Połczyn-Zdrój is bordered by the gminas of Barwice, Białogard, Czaplinek, Ostrowice, Rąbino, Świdwin, Tychowo and Złocieniec.

References
Polish official population figures 2006

Polczyn-Zdroj
Gmina Polczyn Zdroj